Abu Dulaf Mosque is a historic mosque located approximately  north of Samarra in the Saladin Governorate, Iraq. The mosque was commissioned by the 10th Abbasid Caliph Al-Mutawakkil in 859. The mosque is rectangular shaped, and consisted of the open air sahn surrounded by the corridors with the qibla corridor being the biggest of them. The iconic spiral minaret which resembles the renowned Malwiya of the Great Mosque of Samarra is located at the northern side. The unique design of the minaret is said to be inspired by the similar structure in Firuzabad, while others believe the minaret's unique spiral design is derived from the architecture of the Mesopotamian ziggurats (modern day Iraq).

The minaret reaches  and standing on a square base.

See also

 Islam in Iraq
 List of mosques in Iraq

References

9th-century mosques
Abbasid architecture
Buildings and structures in Samarra
Mosques in Iraq
Sunni mosques in Iraq